Karizma (trans. Charisma) is a Serbian and former Yugoslav hard rock/glam metal band.

Band history

1985 - 1994
Karizma was formed in Belgrade in 1985. They were inspired by bands such as Bon Jovi, Iron Maiden and Def Leppard. In 1988 Karizma won the first place at Gitarijada festival in Zaječar and released their debut album Vreme je za nas (It's Time for Us) in 1989, in the following lineup: Dušan Zarić (vocals), Dušan "Duca" Janićijević (guitar), Dragoljub "Đoki" Popović (guitar), Zoran Miletić (bass guitar), Dejan Tomović (keyboard) and Srđan Milenković (drums). After the album was released, Zarić left the band due to his army obligations. A former Otkrovenje member Dejan "Jelfan" Jelisavčić replaced Zarić. In 1990, the band was awarded with MESAM Festival's Award for the Best Debut Act in 1989. During the same year Karizma was the opening band on Kerber tour.

In 1991, the band released its second studio album U snovima (In the Dreams) with  Goran "Edi" Tadić (drums) as Karizma's new member. Tadić also designed the album cover. The album featured a cover of Oliver Mandić's song "Ljuljaj me nežno". In 1993 bass guitarist Saša Đokić and drummer Dragan Živković replaced Tomović and Tadić. Živković was previously a member of the band Bride with Slav Simanic. In 1994, the band recorded demos for the album that was never released and disbanded soon after. During the same year, the band's song "Daj mi" ("Let Me") was released on Komuna compilation album Pakleni vozači: Jugoslovenski hard rock (Hell Riders: Yugoslav Hard Rock).

2005 - present
In 2005, Karizma reunited with Nemanja Petrović (keyboard) and a former Jugosloveni and Tifa Band member Saša "Đole" Đokić (guitar) as the band's new members. During the same year band released the compilation album Retro-active, which consisted of the remastered songs from U snovima, song "Ludnica" ("Madhouse") recorded in 1994 and the new version of "Vrati se". In 2006, a former Ruski Rulet and Alisa keyboardist Nenad Đorđević replaced Petrović, and one of the original Karizma members, Dragoljub Popović returned to the band.

In June 2014, the band a remixed version of "Vrati se", releasing it as a single.

At the end of 2016, Karizma released their third studio album, entitled Smej se (Laugh), through PGP-RTS. The lineup of the band which recorded the album consisted of Dejan Jelisavčić (vocals), Dušan "Duca" Janićijević (guitar), Dragoljub Popović (guitar), Saša Đokić (bass guitar), Dragan "Pizi" Živković (drums), Nenad "Žvaka "Đorđević (keyboards). The album was produced by Jelisavčić. The album cover was designed by the band's former member Goran Tadić. The album featured 12 songs, including a cover of Hardline song "Takin' Me Down" entitled "Ritam mi daj" ("Give Me Rhythm").

Discography

Studio albums
Vreme je za nas (1988)
U snovima (1991)
Smej se (2016)

Compilations
Retro-active (2005)

References 

Serbian hard rock musical groups
Yugoslav hard rock musical groups
Serbian heavy metal musical groups
Yugoslav glam metal musical groups
Musical groups from Belgrade
Musical groups established in 1985
1985 establishments in Yugoslavia